Anatoly Grigorievich Dernovoi (born 26 August 1951) was a Kazakhstani politician who served as a Minister of Healthcare in the Government of Kazakhstan.

Minister Dernovoi's predecessor, Erbolat Dosaev, was fired amid a scandal over the accidental infection of 76 children, six of whom died, with HIV. Dernovoi announced in a government meeting that eight of the children's mothers were also infected accidentally.

References

External links
Government in Kazakhstan addresses HIV-infection scandal

Living people
Ministers of Health (Kazakhstan)
1951 births